The 2020–21 season was the first season of ATK Mohun Bagan FC since the merger of ATK and Mohun Bagan. This merged club competed in ISL, one of the top flights of Indian football, as well as in the AFC Cup (because of delays, the AFC Cup campaign has been moved to 2021–22 season).

Players
{|class="wikitable" style="text-align:center; font-size:90%; width:80%;"
|-
!style="background:#1A5026; color:white; text-align:center;"|Squad No.
!style="background:#1A5026; color:white; text-align:center;"|Name
!style="background:#1A5026; color:white; text-align:center;"|Nationality
!style="background:#1A5026; color:white; text-align:center;"|Position
!style="background:#1A5026; color: white; text-align: center;"| & Age
|-
!colspan=6 style="background:#7a1024; color:white; text-align:center;"|Goalkeepers
|-
|12
|Avilash Paul
|
|GK
|
|-
|29
|Arindam Bhattacharya (Captain)
| 
|GK
|
|-
!colspan=6 style="background:#7a1024; color:white; text-align:center;"|Defenders
|-
|2
|Sumit Rathi
|
|DF
|
|-
|5
|Sandesh Jhingan (Captain)
|
|DF
|
|-
|15
|Subhasish Bose
|
|DF
|
|-
|20
|Pritam Kotal (Captain)
|
|DF
|
|-
|27
|Boris Singh Thangjam
|
|DF
|
|-
|44
|Tiri
|
|DF
|
|-
!colspan=6 style="background:#7a1024; color:white; text-align:center;"|Midfielders
|-
|8
|Carl McHugh
|
|MF
|
|-
|10
|Edu García (Captain)
|
|MF
|
|-
|11
|Brad Inman
|
|MF
|
|-
|14
|Glan Martins
|
|MF
|
|-
|16
|Jayesh Rane
|
|MF
|
|-
|17
|Pronay Halder
|
|MF
|
|-
|18
|Sheikh Sahil
|
|MF
|
|-
|19
|Javi Hernández
|
|MF
|
|-
|23
|Michael Soosairaj
|
|MF
|
|-
|25
|Michael Regin
|
|MF
|
|-
|33
|Prabir Das
|
|MF
|
|-
!colspan=6 style="background:#7a1024; color:white; text-align:center;"|Forwards
|-
|6
|Manvir Singh
|
|FW
|
|-
|9
|David Williams
|
|FW
|
|-
|21
|Roy Krishna (Captain)
|
|FW
|
|-

Management team
{| class="wikitable"
|-
!style="background:#1a5026; color:white; text-align:center"|Position
!style="background:#7a1024; color:white; text-align:center"|Name
|-
|-
| Head coach
| Antonio López Habas
|-
|-
| Assistant coach 
| Manuel Cascallana
|-
|-
| Goalkeeping coach
| Ángel Pindado
|-
|-
| Head of Youth Development/Assistant Manager
| Sanjoy Sen

Competitions

Overview

Indian Super League

Regular season

League table

Results by matchday

Matches

ISL play-offs

ATK Mohun Bagan defeated NorthEast United on the aggregate score of 3–2.

Statistics

Goal scorers

Clean sheets

See also
 2020–21 in Indian football

Notes

References

ATK Mohun Bagan FC seasons
2020–21 Indian Super League season by team